Dacia may refer to:

Places

Historic 
Dacia, Kingdom of Dacians, an ancient geographic demarcation of Central and Southeastern Europe
 Roman Dacia (also known as Dacia Felix, Dacia Traiana or Dacia Trajana), an ancient Roman imperial province located in Central and Eastern Europe
 Dacia Aureliana, an ancient Roman province located in the Balkans
 Dacia Mediterranea, part of former Dacia Aureliana 
 Dacia Ripensis, an ancient Roman province, part of Dacia Aureliana
 Diocese of Dacia, a Roman diocese in Southeastern Europe
 Dacia, a former ecclesiastical province covering the entire Nordic region, the name a combination of the toponyms Dania and Suecia, the Medieval Latin names for Denmark and Sweden

Modern 
 Dacia, Bălți, a neighbourhood in Bălți, Moldova
 Dacia, a village in Doba, Satu Mare, Romania
 Dacia, Brașov, a village in Jibert Commune, Brașov County, Romania
 Dacia, a village in Nicșeni Commune, Botoșani County, Romania

Automobiles 
 Automobile Dacia, a Romanian automobile maker
 Dacia 1300, a family sedan
 Dacia Lăstun, a car manufactured by Tehnometal
 Dacia Logan, a compact
 Dacia Logan Cup, a lowcost series 
 Dacia Nova, a hatchback
 Dacia Pick-Up, a pick-up truck
 Dacia Sandero, a five-door hatchback 
 Dacia Solenza, a sedan
 Dacia SupeRNova, a hatchback

Books and publications 
 Dacia Literară, an 1840 Romanian literary and political journal
 Dacia (journal), a Romanian academic journal of archeology 
 Dacia (Pârvan), a Romanian history book 
 Editura Dacia, a Romanian publisher

Football 
 ACS Dacia Unirea Brăila, a Romanian football team
 Dacia Mioveni, a Romanian football team
 FC Dacia Chișinău, a Moldovan football team
 Stadionul Dacia (Mioveni), a football stadium
 Stadionul Dacia (Orăștie), a football stadium

People 
 Dacia Arcaráz (born 1967), Mexican actress
 Dacia Grayber, American firefighter and politician
 Dacia Maraini (born 1936), Italian writer
 Dacia Valent (1963–2015), Somali-born Italian politician and Member of the European Parliament
 Boetius of Dacia, 13th century Danish philosopher
 Jacob the Dacian (c. 1484–1566), Danish monk and missionary
 Martin of Dacia (1220–1304), Danish scholar
 Petrus de Dacia (mathematician) (c. 1250–c. 1310)
 Petrus de Dacia (Swedish monk) (1235–1289)

Other 
 Dacia Felix Bank, a defunct bank in Romania
 Dacia Hotel, a hotel in Satu Mare, Romania
 Diocese of Dacia Felix, a Romanian Orthodox diocese covering the east of Serbia

See also 
 Dacicus (disambiguation)